Antardhan is a Bengali thriller drama film directed by Tapan Sinha and produced by Naba Kumar Chandra based on a true story of disappearance of a lady. This film was released in 1992. this is the debut film of Bengali actor Sabyasachi Chakraborty.

Plot
Professor Sushobhan Mukherjee and his wife go to visit his ill health brother. When they return find their only daughter Ina is missing. Sushobhan files FIR in police. Investigations reveals that Ina had gone out with one Barun Lahiri who is actually imposter, involves with a criminal gang. Barun entraps Ina and uses her to entertain their clients. An officer of investigating team takes bribe and makes a false report. Sushobhan himself searches his daughter and goes to Orissa. Finally police rescue Ina from Barun's den.

Cast
 Soumitra Chatterjee as Sushobhan
 Madhabi Mukherjee as Lina Sushobhan's wife
 Satabdi Roy as Ina
 Sabyasachi Chakraborty as Police Inspector Rohit
 Arjun Chakraborty as Barun
 Manoj Mitra as Advocate
 Nirmal Kumar as Police Inspector
 Bhishma Guhathakurta

References

1992 films
Bengali-language Indian films
Indian thriller drama films
Films directed by Tapan Sinha
1990s Bengali-language films
Drama films based on actual events
1990s thriller drama films
1992 drama films